The 10 cm M. 14 Feldhaubitze was a dual-purpose field and mountain gun used by Austria-Hungary during World War I. Between the wars it was used by Austria, Italy, and Poland. During World War II it served as the standard medium howitzer of the Royal Italian Army with the designation Obice da 100/17 modello 14 and after 1943 captured weapons were used by Nazi Germany's Wehrmacht under the designations 10 cm leFH 14(ö) and 10 cm leFH 315(i). After World War II an updated howitzer remained in service with the Italian Army until 1975.

Design
It was a conventional design, although the first versions used an obsolescent wrought bronze barrel liner and a cast bronze jacket. Later versions used a standard steel barrel. The spade was in two pieces, one designed for use in icy ground and the other in normal soil.

Two cannoneers sat in seats attached to the shield, as was normal for the period. It was pulled by three pairs of horses when attached to its limber. The Austro-Hungarian Army acquired 6,458 10 cm Mod. 14 howitzers for its Field Howitzer Regiments ("Feldhaubitze-Regiment") and 346 10 cm M. 16 howitzers for its mountain troops. The Mod. 16 could be broken down into three loads carried on small carts for transport in rough terrain.

Postwar some weapons were modernized for motor towing with new rubber-tired wheels and the seats on the shield removed. A more extensive postwar update by Czechoslovakia was designated as the 10 cm houfnice vz. 14/19 and was exported to Poland, Greece and Yugoslavia.

Royal Italian Army 

During World War I the Royal Italian Army had captured 1,222 10 cm Mod. 14/16 howitzers from the Austro-Hungarian Army. A further 1,472 were given to Italy as war reparations. In Italian service the guns were designated Obice da 100/17 Mod. 14 and Obice da 100/17 Mod. 16. The Royal Army Arsenal in Turin developed a new series of ammunition for the howitzers which were introduced in 1932 and included chemical warfare grenades. At the outbreak of World War II the Royal Army and the Guardia alla Frontiera were fielding 1,325 Mod. 14 in the original Austro-Hungarian configuration and 199 Mod 14, which had their wooden wheels replaced with tires for use in motorized divisions. The artillery of the Alpini mountain troops fielded 181 Mod. 16. howitzers. During the North African Campaign Italian forces mounted the 100/17 Mod. 14 onto Lancia 3Ro heavy trucks and employed the gun as mobile anti-tank cannon.

Italian Army 

After World War II some of the howitzers were modified by the Military Arsenal of Naples for use as mountain artillery, with the denominations 100/17 Mod. 14 mont. and 100/17 Mod. 16 mont. In the second half of the fifties the howitzers were further modified for the service in the Italian Army with the versions 100/17 Mod. 14/50 for field artillery units and 100/17 Mod. 14/16/50 for mountain artillery units. The modification of the field artillery version included a circular shooting platform, pneumatic wheels and a gun shield taken from reserve Ordnance QF 25-pounder howitzers, while the mountain artillery version omitted the circular shooting platform.

In 1961 the weapon was again modified by lengthening the barrel and recalibrating it for NATO ammunition, resulting in a barrel to caliber ratio of 105/22. Accordingly the new version was named: 105/22 Mod. 14/61. This version equipped the field artillery groups of the army's motorized divisions.

With the Italian Army's 1975 reform the 105/22 Mod. 14/61 was taken out of service and stored as reserve until 1984. Today only one 105/22 Mod. 14/61 remains in service with the Italian Army: located in Rome on the Janiculum it is fired since 1991 at noon every day to indicate the time.

Notes

References 
Note: The data for this howitzer differs between sources, also considering how often it was modified, and cannot be considered definitive. Data provided has generally been for a steel-tubed howitzer as given at the U.S. Army Field Artillery Museum, Ft. Sill, Oklahoma.
 Englemann, Joachim and Scheibert, Horst. Deutsche Artillerie 1934-1945: Eine Dokumentation in Text, Skizzen und Bildern: Ausrüstung, Gliderung, Ausbildung, Führung, Einsatz. Limburg/Lahn, Germany: C. A. Starke, 1974
 Gander, Terry and Chamberlain, Peter. Weapons of the Third Reich: An Encyclopedic Survey of All Small Arms, Artillery and Special Weapons of the German Land Forces 1939-1945. New York: Doubleday, 1979

External links

 

 

World War I howitzers
World War II field artillery
World War II artillery of Germany
World War I artillery of Austria-Hungary
World War II artillery of Italy
100 mm artillery
World War II howitzers